Felix Headley Bennett OD (29 May 1931 – 21 August 2016), also known as Deadly Headley, was a Jamaican saxophonist who performed on hundreds of recordings since the 1950s.

Biography
Born in Kingston, Jamaica, Bennett attended the Alpha Boys School from the age of five, where he learned to play the saxophone. He left Alpha aged fifteen. Since the 1950s, Bennett has worked as a session musician in Jamaica, playing in the Studio One house band as well as in Lynn Taitt's band The Jets, The Mighty Vikings, and in The Revolutionaries. In 1962, as a member of The Sheiks, he performed at Palisadoes Airport to greet Princess Margaret on her visit to the island to mark Jamaica's independence. In the ska era of the late 1950s and 1960s, he played on many recordings for a variety of studios including Bob Marley's first recording, "Judge Not", for Leslie Kong, and Derrick & Patsy's "Housewives Choice". Prince Buster claimed Bennett's solo in Derrick Morgan's song "Forward March" was stolen from Lester Sterling's solo in Buster's own track "They Got to Come", leading to a feud between Buster and Morgan. He went on to record with The Abyssinians, Alton Ellis, and Prince Far I among many others. In the late 1960s he moved to Canada, returning to Jamaica in 1977.

While the majority of his recordings have been as a session musician, he has released two albums where he is credited as the main artist. In the late 1970s he released an album of instrumental versions of soul ballads with Ossie Scott, Deadly Headly Bennett Meets The Magnificent Ossie Scott, and in 1981 he recorded 35 Years From Alpha with producer Adrian Sherwood, released in 1982 and reissued in 1999.

In 2005, aged 74, Bennet was awarded the Order of Distinction in the rank of Officer for his contribution to the development of music by the Jamaican government.

He was revealed to be in financial difficulties in 2013, suffering from back and prostate problems due to mounting medical bills.

Bennet died on 21 August 2016, having recently been diagnosed with prostate cancer.

Album discography
Deadly Headly Bennett Meets The Magnificent Ossie Scott (197?), Carl's/Gorgon – with Ossie Scott
35 Years From Alpha (1982), On-U Sound

Notes

References
Barrow, Steve & Dalton, Peter (2004) The Rough Guide to Reggae, 3rd edn., Rough Guides, 
Campbell, Howard (2009) "Self-rule was music to one's ears – Bennett", Jamaica Gleaner, 5 August 2009, retrieved 6 December 2009
Larkin, Colin (1998) The Virgin Encyclopedia of Reggae, Virgin Books, 
Moskowitz, David V, (2006) Caribbean Popular Music: an Encyclopedia of Reggae, Mento, Ska, Rock Steady, and Dancehall, Greenwood Press,

External links
Headley Bennett at Roots Archives

1931 births
2016 deaths
Jamaican saxophonists
Male saxophonists
Jamaican reggae musicians
Musicians from Kingston, Jamaica
Officers of the Order of Distinction
20th-century saxophonists
21st-century saxophonists
20th-century male musicians
21st-century male musicians